The following radio stations broadcast on FM frequency 95.6 MHz:

China 
 Beijing Traffic Radio in Beijing
 CNR The Voice of China in Shijiazhuang and Wuhan

Malaysia
 Asyik FM in Malacca and Northern Johor
 Perak FM in Ipoh, Perak

Morocco
 Hit Radio in Agadir

Turkey
Radyo 1 in İstanbul
Radyo 2 in Antalya
Radyo 2 in Niğde

United Kingdom
BBC Radio Norfolk in Cromer
BBC WM in the West Midlands
BRFM in Isle of Sheppey
BBC Radio Cumbria in Penrith
Seahaven FM in Eastbourne
BBC Radio 4 in Tyrone and Scotland

Vietnam
VOH 95.6, in Voice of Ho Chi Minh City People (VOH)

References

Lists of radio stations by frequency